Kaarlo Teuvo Puro (9 November 1884 Helsinki – 24 July 1956 Helsinki) was a Finnish actor, writer and director.

Puro co-directed the first Finnish fiction film, Salaviinanpolttajat, with Louis Sparre in 1907. He also directed the first (and one of the only) Finnish horror film Noidan Kirot (Curses of the Witch) starring Einar Rinne and Heidi Blafield. Another film by Puro is Anna-Liisa (1922).

References

External links 

1884 births
1956 deaths
Male actors from Helsinki
People from Uusimaa Province (Grand Duchy of Finland)
Finnish film directors
Finnish male film actors
Finnish male silent film actors
20th-century Finnish male actors
Finnish screenwriters
20th-century screenwriters